Barbara Gott (1872–1944) was a Scottish stage and film actress. In 1913 she made her West End debut in Stanley Houghton's Trust the People.

Partial filmography

 Betta, the Gipsy (1918)
 The Romance of Lady Hamilton (1919) - Mrs. Kelly
 Linked by Fate (1919) - Deborah
 The Little People (1927) - Sala
 Downhill (1927) - Madame Michet
 Not Quite a Lady (1928) - Mrs. Borridge
 Paradise (1928) - Lady Liverage
 Ringing the Changes (1929) - Mrs. Giggleswick
 Lily of Killarney (1929) - Sheelah
 A Sister to Assist 'Er (1930) - Mrs. May
 The House of the Arrow (1930) - Mrs. Harlow
 The Night Porter (1930)
 At the Villa Rose (1930) - Mme. D'Auvray
 Lord Richard in the Pantry (1930) - Cook
 Compromising Daphne (1930) - Martha
 The Sport of Kings (1931) - Cook
 Sally in Our Alley (1931) - Mrs. Pool
 The Flying Fool (1931) - Mme. Charron
 Sunshine Susie (1931) - Minor Role
 The Professional Guest (1931)
 The Water Gipsies (1932) - Mrs. Green
 A Safe Proposition (1932) - Emily Woodford
 The Good Companions (1933) - Big Annie
 The Crime at Blossoms (1933) - Fat Lady
 Born Lucky (1933) - Cook
 Cleaning Up (1933) - Lady Rudd
 Great Stuff (1933) - Claudette Mongomery
 Song at Eventide (1934) - Anna
 Children of the Fog (1935) - Mrs. Jenner
 The Beloved Vagabond (1936) - Concierge
 Pastor Hall (1940) - Frau Kemp (final film role)

References

Bibliography
 Wearing, J.P. The London Stage 1910-1919: A Calendar of Productions, Performers, and Personnel..  Rowman & Littlefield, 2013.

External links

1872 births
1944 deaths
Scottish stage actresses
Scottish film actresses
Scottish silent film actresses
People from Stirling
20th-century Scottish actresses